Holger Winselmann (born 11 November 1963) is a German handball player. He competed at the 1988 Summer Olympics and the 1992 Summer Olympics.

References

External links
 

1963 births
Living people
German male handball players
Olympic handball players of East Germany
Olympic handball players of Germany
Handball players at the 1988 Summer Olympics
Handball players at the 1992 Summer Olympics
Sportspeople from Magdeburg